The 20×110mm USN (also known as 20×110mm US Navy and 20mm Mk-100 Series) is an autocannon cartridge developed by the US Navy after World War II for use in Mk 11 and Mk 12 autocannons. They are called the Mk 100 series as they range from Mk 101 to Mk 109.

It has the same rim diameter as the 20×102mm but a different length and contour. It is not interchangeable with any other 20×110mm cartridge.

Available loads
Some of the available loads for the 20×110mm USN are as follows:

There is also a cartridge, 20 mm, dummy, Mk 103 Mod 0 (USN) which is an inert round. It has an empty primer pocket and holes in the case or a plugged primer pocket. It may be empty or filled with inert material. The projectile is usually brass or bronze plated.

References

Large-caliber cartridges